Charonia tritonis, common name the Triton's trumpet, the giant triton or   is a species of very large sea snail, a marine gastropod mollusc in the family Charoniidae, the tritons. Reaching up to two feet (or 60 cm) in shell length this is one of the biggest mollusks in the coral reef.

Distribution
This species is found throughout the Indo-Pacific Oceans, Red Sea included.

Description

Feeding habits
C. tritonis is one of the few animals to feed on the crown-of-thorns starfish, Acanthaster planci. Occasional plagues of this large and destructive starfish have killed extensive areas of coral on the Great Barrier Reef of Australia and the western Pacific reefs. The triton has been described as tearing the starfish to pieces with its file-like radula.

Human use

The shell is well known as a decorative object, and is sometimes modified for use as a trumpet (such as the Japanese horagai, the Maldivian sangu, the Hawaiian pū (hoʻokani) or the Māori pūtātara).

Much debate has occurred on whether plagues of crown-of-thorns starfish are natural or are caused by overfishing of the few organisms that can eat this starfish, including C. tritonis. In 1994, Australia proposed that C. tritonis should be put on the CITES list, thereby attempting to protect the species. Because of a lack of trade data concerning this seashell, the Berne Criteria from CITES were not met, and the proposal was consequently withdrawn. While this species may be protected in Australia and other countries (such as India), it can be legally traded and is found for sale in many shell shops around the world and on the internet.

References

Bibliography

External links

 doriss.ffessm.fr
 na.oceana.org
 cites.org (PDF)
 

Charoniidae
Gastropods described in 1758
Taxa named by Carl Linnaeus